Yagyū Shume was a Korean-born retainer who served Yagyū clan. Few records discuss his activity as a samurai. However, he is known as a central figure of the feud of Yagyū clan between Yagyū domain line from Yagyū Munenori and Owari domain line from Yagyū Toshitoshi.

Life 
The only reliable document about Shume's  origin is『玉栄拾遺 written by Hagiwara Nobuyuki the retainer of Yagyū domain in 1753, mentioning that "According to tradition, Shume was the blood of Joseon". However, a Korean retainer of Yagyū speculated to be Shune was mentioned in 『耳嚢』(Mimibukuro) the essay and kaidan written by Negishi Jin'e in late 18th century. According to this, one day Takuan Sōhō visited the mansion of Yagyū Munenori, and he found that a Ge (Japanese version of Gatha) hung at guardhouse.
Fishes and dragons live in blue sea; Mountains and woods are houses of animals; However even in those 66 provinces of Japan; There is no place I settles down. Takuan said that "This is interesting poem though the last verse was defect". A gatekeeper replies, "There is no fefect. It's my poem". This man was actually Korean who fled from Joseon. Munenori heard about him from Takuan, and soon employed him as samurai of 200koku。

This essay was written long after Shume's lifetime, and it is uncertain that this Korean man was actually Shume.

According to a more reliable document, 『玉栄拾遺』, Shume was a retainer of Yagyū clan and married the sister of Toshitoshi through the good offices of Munenori. She first married Yamazaki Sōzaemon in Iga province, but did not get on well with him and returned to her hometown. However, contrary to his uncle, Toshitoshi was incensed that his sister married a man of Korean descent and  broke off relations with Munenori.

According to『柳生藩旧記』(Yagyū han nikki, or Yagyū clan diary), Shume was originally named Sano Shume. This diary explained the reason for Toshitoshi's anger. Shume was not only a foreigner but a man Toshitoshi never met. Furthermore, Munenori allowed the marriage without consulting Toshitoshi.

After this event, Yagyū domain line and Owari domain line never made peace. However, this was not just because Shume married Toshitoshi's sister. Toshitoshi was the son of Munenori's elder brother, Toshikatsu and proud of himself as true successor of the Yagyū clan.

Shume died in 1651. He was buried in cemetery of Yagyū clan in Hōtokuji Temple.

References 

 白井伊佐牟「朝鮮人の柳生藩士 柳生主馬と柳生家の人々」、『皇学館論叢』第41巻第1号、皇学館大学人文学会 、2008年

See also 
 Rinoie Motohiro - Korean-born swordsman who received menkyo of Yagyū Shinkage-ryū.

Samurai
17th-century Korean people
Foreign samurai in Japan
Yagyū clan
1651 deaths